Bagber is a hamlet in the county of Dorset in southern England, situated about  west and northwest of Sturminster Newton in the North Dorset administrative district. It consists of Bagber, Lower Bagber and Bagber Common, which all lie within Sturminster Newton civil parish. Chapel Row consists of around 10 houses in total, 6 of them being within 300 metres of the main A357. These six date back to the 19th century with the chapel now being now no. 6.

The poet William Barnes was born in Bagber in 1801.

External links

Hamlets in Dorset
Sturminster Newton